Independencia is a province of the Dominican Republic, located in the west, on the border with Haiti. Its capital is Jimani. The province was created in 1948 but was made official in 1950. Before its creation, it was part of the Baoruco Province. The name was given in remembrance of the National Independence of February 27, 1844.

History 
The province Independencia was founded in the lands that in previous times belonged to a Cacique called Ximani who was related to the cacicazgo of Xaragua. Little is known of Ximani as the ties with between the natives of Ximani and the Spanish were practically non-existent. The law that created this province, December 29, 1948, had originally assigned the name of "Provincia de Jimaní" to the province. The name was then changed January 28, 1949, to "Provincia Nueva Era". The name was then finally changed to the present one, "Independence", on May 13, 1949.

Municipalities and municipal districts

The province as of June 20, 2006, is divided into the following municipalities (municipios) and municipal districts (distritos municipales - D.M.) within the latter:
Cristóbal
 Batey 8 (D.M.)
Duvergé	
Vengan a Ver (D.M.)
Puerto Escondido (D.M.)
Jimaní	
Boca de Cachón (D.M.)
El Limón (D.M.)	
La Descubierta	
Mella	
La Colonia (D.M.)
Postrer Río	
Guayabal (D.M.)

The following is a sortable table of the municipalities and municipal districts, with population figures as of the 2012 census. Urban population are those living in the seats (cabeceras, literally "heads") of municipalities or of municipal districts. Rural population are those living in the districts (Secciones, literally "sections") and neighborhoods (Parajes, literally "places") outside of them.

For comparison with the municipalities and municipal districts of other provinces see the list of municipalities and municipal districts of the Dominican Republic.

See also

References

External links
  Oficina Nacional de Estadística, Maps with administrative division of the provinces of the Dominican Republic, downloadable in PDF format

 
Provinces of the Dominican Republic
States and territories established in 1950